Culver Franchising System, LLC (Culver's) is an American fast-casual restaurant chain. The company was founded in 1984 by George, Ruth, Craig, and Lea Culver. The first location opened in Sauk City, Wisconsin, on July 18, 1984, under the name "Culver's Frozen Custard and ButterBurgers." The privately held company is headquartered in Prairie du Sac, Wisconsin. The chain operates primarily in the Midwestern United States, and has a total of 899 restaurants in 26 states as of February 2023.

Culver's menu is mostly known for its butter burgers and frozen custard, but also offers cheese curds, chicken, fish, and salads.

History
Sauk City restaurateurs and husband and wife team George and Ruth Culver started their fast food careers as the owners of an A&W on Phillips Boulevard (U.S. Highway 12) in 1961. In 1968, they purchased a resort-styled restaurant at Devil's Lake called The Farm Kitchen. Their son, Craig Culver, worked for a local McDonald's right out of college in 1973. After selling their restaurants and quitting their jobs, George, Ruth, Craig, and his former wife Lea opened the first Culver's Frozen Custard and ButterBurgers on July 18, 1984. Craig led the company from its inception until 2015.

In October 2017, Culver's sold a minority share to Roark Capital Group, a private equity firm based in Atlanta. The Culver family retains majority ownership.

Wisconsin

In 1988, the Culver family were approached about franchising a restaurant in nearby Richland Center. The family agreed, granting the franchisee a loose licensing agreement, charging no fees or royalties. Because the franchisee had invested very little of his own money, it was a simple matter for him to walk away a year later when he decided he no longer wanted to be in the restaurant business.

As a result of this experience, the Culver family established a set of standard franchising procedures that form the basis for those currently used by Culver Franchising System, Inc. Three years later, they tried again in Baraboo, and business quickly doubled. Soon after, the increased recognition that the second store earned this small-town chain prompted expansion into the Middleton, Madison and Milwaukee areas.

Midwest
In 1993, Culver's was still a small, local chain, with only 14 restaurants across southern Wisconsin. Culver's first restaurants outside Wisconsin opened in Buffalo, Minnesota, in September 1995, Roscoe, Illinois, in December 1995, and Dubuque, Iowa, in November 1997. In February 1998, the company opened the first Culver's outside the Midwest in Texas.

Beyond the Midwest

The current franchising strategy is one of contiguous expansion at a pace of about 40 new stores per year. The chain expanded into Colorado Springs, Colorado, and Cheyenne, Wyoming, in 2005, followed by an opening in Bowling Green, Kentucky, in July 2006. Culver's shifted its attention to developing markets beyond the Midwest.

The Metro-98 prototype, developed in 2006 and first constructed in Fort Dodge, Iowa, was much more compact than the traditional 120-seater commonly built through much of Culver's expansion. While the Metro-98 has less seating to offer guests, it also reduced the amount of land needed for construction by around 20%.

In 2008, Culver's expanded to the Phoenix metropolitan area. As of July 2017, Arizona had 26 locations. A location set to open in Bullhead City may signal a future expansion into Las Vegas. At the end of 2011, 445 Culver's restaurants were open in 19 states. Culver's also opened in South Carolina in 2012; Florida, Georgia, and Tennessee in 2014; and North Carolina in 2015. On June 28, 2018, Culver's had announced that a location will be opening in Alabama. In January 2022, Culver's expanded into the state of Arkansas.

In 2011, Culver's expanded into Utah, when Kristin and Tom Davis of Wisconsin relocated to Utah and opened a 100-seat Culver's franchise in Midvale.  The couple signed a development agreement for four locations in the southern half of Salt Lake County.

Venture into casual dining
Culver's Blue Spoon Cafe opened its first store in Prairie du Sac, Wisconsin, in 2000 as a soup-sandwich-salad restaurant as Blue Spoon Creamery Cafe. The name Blue Spoon comes from the color of the spoons used at the Culver's fast food restaurants. A second store in Middleton, Wisconsin, was open for two years but closed in August 2010. The Prairie du Sac location closed in May 2020 during the COVID-19 pandemic.

More recent developments 
In 2013, according to a survey by Franchise Business Review, "Culver Franchising System was rated No. 1 in franchisee satisfaction among restaurant franchises."

Menu 

Culver's menu comprises butter burgers, chicken sandwiches, fish, salads, french fries, and cheese curds. For dessert, the restaurant offers its frozen custard, served in either a dish, cone, or blended into a concrete mixer or shake.

On October 15, 2021, in celebration of National Cheese Curd Day, Culver's sold a limited-time product: the CurderBurger, consisting of a large cheese curd on top of a burger patty. On April 1, Culver's released an April Fools' joke showing a large fried cheese curd in a burger bun, naming it the CurderBurger. Soon after the post was made, a change.org petition was created to make the burger a reality, gathering over 600 signatures. Each location only got a limited number of cheese curd patties, and all Madison, Wisconsin, restaurants sold out before noon.

Sponsorships
Culver's sponsors sports teams, including the St. Cloud Rox, Wisconsin Badgers, Milwaukee Admirals, Iowa Hawkeyes, Minnesota Wild, Minnesota Golden Gophers, St. Louis Billikens, Indiana Hoosiers, Madison Mallards, Louisville Bats, Chicago White Sox, Chicago Blackhawks and Chicago Cubs. Culver's also sponsors the WIAC baseball championship.

Official mascot
The official Culver's mascot is an anthropomorphic custard cone named Scoopie, featured in various advertisements, community events, and fundraisers. Along the way, three new characters were added: Fudge the dog, Curdis the Curd, and Goldie the Curd.

See also
 List of frozen custard companies
 List of hamburger restaurants

References

External links

 Culver's website

Companies based in Wisconsin
Restaurants in Wisconsin
Economy of the Midwestern United States
Family-owned companies of the United States
Fast-food chains of the United States
Regional restaurant chains in the United States
Restaurants established in 1984
Fast casual restaurants
Hamburger restaurants
Ice cream parlors in the United States
Restaurant franchises
Frozen custard
Privately held companies based in Wisconsin
1984 establishments in Wisconsin
Culver's
Wisconsin culture